Kotra is a town and a nagar panchayat in Jalaun district in the Indian state of Uttar Pradesh.

Geography
It has an average elevation of 136 metres (446 feet). Kotra is near Holy Betwa River. Today's population is more than 10,000.

Demographics
As of the 2001 Census of India, Kotra had a population of 8,078. Males constitute 54% of the population and females 46%. Kotra has an average literacy rate of 56%, lower than the national average of 59.5%: male literacy is 68%, and female literacy is 43%. In Kotra, 16% of the population is under 6 years of age.80% population depended on  krishi

References

Cities and towns in Jalaun district